Road Rules: The Quest is the tenth season of the MTV reality television series Road Rules. It first aired on MTV in 2001, and featured six strangers chosen to compete in missions, while living in a RV. In this particular season, the contestants drove their RV to missions in Morocco and Spain, with a final mission in the United States. The season also was the first to have a rule where the cast would potentially have to vote a cast member off if the cast failed to meet a certain set of rules pertaining to successful missions completed.

This season of Road Rules was the first and only season to be preceded by a casting special in which 27 potential cast members for the Back to New York edition of The Real World and Road Rules spent time together for a week to see how they interacted to be selected for one of the two shows.

Cast

Original Cast

Replacement

Missions

Episodes

After filming
Adam returned to the series as part of the alumni cast of Road Rules 2007: Viewers' Revenge.

In 2005, Ellen's first child was born.

Blair Herter married Jessica Chobot on February 18, 2012. The couple's first child, Emerson Roland Herter, was born on March 6, 2013.

Katie married Cory Cooley. In 2015, their first daughter, Avery Ryan Cooley, was born.

The Challenge
This is the only season of Road Rules whose entire cast has at one time or another competed in MTV's spin-off reality series The Real World/Road Rules Challenge.

Challenge in bold indicates that the contestant was a finalist on The Challenge.

References

External links

MTV original programming
Road Rules
2001 American television seasons
Television shows filmed in Morocco
Television shows filmed in Spain